is a Japanese manga artist. Her debut short story, "" ( "Angel"), was published in the September 1995 issue of Bessatsu Shōjo Comic magazine and won the 36th Shogakukan  Comic Award. Two of her manga series, Doubt!! and Seiho Boys' High School!, are licensed in English by Viz Media.

Works

  (serialized in Bessatsu Shōjo Comic, 1999)
 Doubt!! (serialized in Bessatsu Shōjo Comic, 2000–2002)
  (serialized in Betsucomi, 2002–2006)
 Seiho Boys' High School! (serialized in Betsucomi, 2006–2010)
  (serialized in Betsucomi, 2007–2016)
  (serialized in Monthly Flowers, 2017–2019)
 Called Game (serialized in Betsucomi, 2017–present)

See also

References

External links
  
 
 Profile at The Ultimate Manga Guide

Female comics writers
Japanese female comics artists
Japanese women writers
Japanese writers
Living people
Manga artists
Women manga artists
Year of birth missing (living people)